Foot Loose & Fancy Free is the eighth studio album by Rod Stewart, released in November 1977 on Riva Records in the UK and Warner Bros in the US.

The album is the second-to-last album of Stewart's acclaimed 1970s albums, beginning with Atlantic Crossing and including the platinum-selling A Night on the Town. The album contains elements of hard rock ("Hot Legs"), funk rock ("You're Insane"), and progressive rock via Motown ("You Keep Me Hanging On"), as well as Stewart's usual ballads ("You're in My Heart"). "I Was Only Joking", a tale about regret and the care-free minds of the young, has become one of Stewart's most loved compositions.

Track listing

Personnel
The Rod Stewart Group
 Rod Stewart – lead and backing vocals
 Gary Grainger – guitar, backing vocals
 Jim Cregan – guitar, backing vocals
 Phil Chen – bass guitar, backing vocals
 Carmine Appice – drums, backing vocals
 Billy Peek – guitar, backing vocals
 John Barlow Jarvis – keyboards, backing vocals
Additional Musicians-
 Fred Tackett - Acoustic guitar (A3)
 Steve Cropper – guitar
 David Foster – keyboards
 Nicky Hopkins – synthesizer
 Roger Bethelmy – drums (B2)
 Paulinho Da Costa, Tommy Vig – percussion
 John Mayall – harmonica on "Born Loose"
 Phil Kenzie – saxophone
 Richard Greene – violin
 Mark Stein – background vocals on "You Keep Me Hangin' On"
 Andy Johns – background vocals, engineering and mixing
 Wally Heider – engineering
 John Naslen – engineering
 Sy Potma – engineering
 Lee Hulko – mastering
 Design and Art Director - Kosh

Charts

Weekly charts

Year-end charts

Certifications

References

1977 albums
Riva Records albums
Rod Stewart albums
Albums produced by Tom Dowd
Warner Records albums